Miss Europe 1955 was the 18th edition of the Miss Europe pageant and the seventh edition under the Mondial Events Organization. It was held in Helsinki, Finland on June 11, 1955. Inga-Britt Söderberg of Finland, was crowned Miss Europe 1955 by out going titleholder Danielle Génault of France.

Results

Placements

Contestants 

 - Edith Philipp
 - Madeleine Lamal
 - Karin Palm-Rasmussen
 - Margaret Rowe
 - Inga-Britt Söderberg†
 - Monique Lambert
 - Sonja Dahnk
 - Depi (Depy) Martini
 - Angelina van Kalkhoven
 - Wandisa Guida
 - Hillevi Larsson
 - Claude Ivry
 - Suna Soley

Notes

Returns

Withdrawals

References

External links 
 

Miss Europe
1955 beauty pageants
1955 in Finland